The 2013 BYU Cougars baseball team represented Brigham Young University in the 2013 NCAA Division I baseball season.  Mike Littlewood was in his 1st season as head coach of the Cougars.  BYU's baseball team came off a 2012 season in which they were 22–27. The Cougars played their home games at Larry H. Miller Field, part of the Miller Park Baseball/ Softball Complex. Picked to finish sixth in the WCC, BYU stunned most people and finished in a 3-way tie for second place. The Cougars won the #3 seed in the WCC Tournament where they knocked out #1-seed Gonzaga. BYU lost twice to eventual tournament champion San Diego to finish the season 32–21.

2013 Roster

Schedule 

! style="background:#FFFFFF;color:#002654;"| Regular Season
|- 

|- bgcolor="#ccffcc"
| February 15 || vs. Northern Colorado || – || Dan Law Field at Rip Griffin Park  || 9–0 ||Desmond Poulson (1–0)||Chris Hammer (0–1) ||None|| 117 || 1–0 || –
|- align="center" bgcolor="#ffbbb"
| February 15 || vs. Northern Colorado || – || Dan Law Field at Rip Griffin Park  || 4–6 ||Jake Johnson (1–0)||James Lengal (0–1)||Josh Tinnon (1)|| 137 || 1–1 || –
|- bgcolor="#ccffcc"
| February 16 || vs. Northern Illinois || – || Dan Law Field at Rip Griffin Park  || 5–3 ||Jeff Barker (1–0)||Jordan Ruckman (0–1)||Matt Milke (1)|| 197 || 2–1 || –
|- align="center" bgcolor="#ffbbb"
| February 16 || at Texas Tech || – || Dan Law Field at Rip Griffin Park  || 1–5 ||Trey Masek (1–0)||Adam Miller (0–1)||Jonathon Tripp (1)|| 2,775 || 2–2 || –
|- align="center" bgcolor="#ffbbb"
| February 21 || at #3 LSU || – || Alex Box Stadium/Skip Bertman Field  || 5–6 ||Joey Bourgeois (1–0)||Matt Milke (0–1)||None|| 9,579 || 2–3 || –
|- align="center" bgcolor="#ffbbb"
| February 22 || vs. Southeastern Louisiana || – || Alex Box Stadium/Skip Bertman Field  || 1–4 ||Dylan Hills (1–0)||Adam Miller (0–2)|| None || 450 || 2–4 || –
|- align="center" bgcolor="#ffbbb"
| February 23 || vs. Southeastern Louisiana || – || Alex Box Stadium/Skip Bertman Field  || 2–3 || Tate Scioneaux (2–0)||Jeff Barker (1–1)||John Gremillion (2)|| 467 || 2–5 || –
|- bgcolor="#ccffcc"
| February 23 || at #3 LSU || – || Alex Box Stadium/Skip Bertman Field  || 9–4 ||Mark Anderson (1–0)||Nate Fury (1–1)||James Lengal (1)|| 6,742 || 3–5 || –
|- bgcolor="#ccffcc"
| February 26 || at Seattle || – || Bannerwood Park  || 5–2 ||Keaton Cenatiempo (1–0)||Garrett Andersen (1–3)||James Lengal (2)|| 127 || 4–5 || –
|- bgcolor="#ccffcc"
| February 27 || at Seattle || – || Bannerwood Park  || 10–0 ||Jeff Barker (2–1)||Skyler Genger (0–3)||None|| 131 || 5–5 || –
|-

|- bgcolor="#ccffcc"
| March 1 || Creighton || – || Bruce Hurst Field  || 9–0 || Desmond Poulson (2–0) || Nick Musec (0–1) ||None|| 412 || 6–5 || –
|- align="center" bgcolor="#ffbbb"
| March 1 || Creighton || – || Bruce Hurst Field || 1–5 || Tommy Strunc (1–0) || Adam Miller (0–3) || None || 412 || 6–6 || –
|- bgcolor="#ccffcc"
| March 2 || Creighton || – || Bruce Hurst Field || 14–5 ||Matt Milke (1–1)|| Mark Lukowski (1–1)|| None || 407 || 7–6 || –
|- bgcolor="#ccffcc"
| March 7 || #21 UC Irvine || – || Larry H. Miller Field || 6–3 || Derek Speigner (1–0) ||Andrew Thurman (1–2) || None || 405 || 8–6 || –
|- bgcolor="#ccffcc"
| March 8 || #21 UC Irvine || – || Larry H. Miller Field || 3–1 || Adam Miller (1–3) || Matt Whitehouse (2–1) || James Lengal (3) || 325 || 9–6 || –
|- align="center" bgcolor="#ffbbb"
| March 9 || #21 UC Irvine || – || Larry H. Miller Field || 3–8 || Andrew Morales (5–0) || Jeff Barker (2–2)|| None || 1,146 || 9–7 || –
|- align="center" bgcolor="#ffbbb"
| March 14 || at San Diego* || – || Fowler Park || 5–7 || PJ Conlon (4–0) || James Lengal (0–2) || None || 662 || 9–8 || 0–1
|- align="center" bgcolor="#ffbbb"
| March 15 || at San Diego* || – || Fowler Park || 3–5 || Max Homick (3–0) || Adam Miller (1–4) || Max Mcnabb (2) || 882 || 9–9 || 0–2
|- align="center" bgcolor="#ffbbb"
| March 16 || at San Diego* || – || Fowler Park || 9–10 (14) || Sheldon Ekstrand (2–0) || Keaton Cenatiempo (0–1) || None || 807 || 9–10 || 0–3
|- align="center" bgcolor="#ffbbb"
| March 19 || at UNLV || – || Earl Wilson Stadium || 3–10  || Mark Shannon (3–0) || Mark Anderson (1–1) || None || 466 || 9–11 || 0–3 
|- bgcolor="#ccffcc"
| March 20 || Kansas || – || Larry H. Miller Field || 3–0 || Desmond Poulson (3–0) || Tanner Poppe (1–1) || None || 758 || 10–11 || 0–3
|- align="center" bgcolor="#ffbbb"
| March 21 || Kansas || – || Larry H. Miller Field || 4–15 || Frank Duncan (2–2) || Adam Miller (1–5) || None || 744 || 10–12 || 0–3
|- bgcolor="#ccffcc"
| March 23 || Kansas || – || Larry H. Miller Field || 6–3 || Jeff Barker (3–2) || Wes Benjamin (2–3) || James Lengal (4) || 223 || 11–12 || 0–3
|- align="center" bgcolor="#ffbbb"
| March 26 || at Utah || – || Spring Mobile Ballpark || 4–5 (10) || Josh Chapman (3–1) || James Lengal (0–3) || None || 1,268 || 11–13 || 0–3
|- bgcolor="#ccffcc"
| March 28 || Pepperdine* || – || Larry H. Miller Field || 8–3 || Derek Speigner (2–0) || Eric Karch (5–2) || None || 777 || 12–13 || 1–3
|- bgcolor="#ccffcc"
| March 29 || Pepperdine* || – || Larry H. Miller Field || 10–9 || Mark Anderson (2–1) || Scott Frazier (2–4) || Derek Speigner (1) || 1,023 || 13–13 || 2–3
|- bgcolor="#ffbbbc"
| March 30 || Pepperdine* || – || Larry H. Miller Field || 6–9 || Aaron Brown (2–1) || Keaton Cenatiempo (1–2) || Michael Swanner (6) || 1,593 || 13–14 || 2–4
|-

|- bgcolor="#ccffcc"
|April 2 || Utah Valley || – || Larry H. Miller Field || 8–0 || Mark Anderson (3–1) || Devin Nelson (1–3) || None || 1,159 || 14–14 || 2–4
|- bgcolor="#ccffcc"
|April 4 || at Santa Clara* || – || Stephen Schott Stadium || 3–1 || Desmond Poulson (4–0) || Reece Karalus (0–6) || None || 183 || 15–14 || 3–4
|- bgcolor="#ccffcc"
|April 5 || at Santa Clara* || – || Stephen Schott Stadium || 8–2 || Adam Miller (2–6) || Mike Couch (3–5) || Matt Milke (2) || 381 || 16–14 || 4–4
|- bgcolor="#ccffcc"
|April 6 || at Santa Clara* || – || Stephen Schott Stadium || 5–2 || Derek Speigner (3–0) || Max Deering (1–3) || None || 284 || 17–14 || 5–4
|- bgcolor="#CCCCCC"
|April 8 || Washington State || – || Larry H. Miller Field ||colspan=7|  Cancelled due to weather
|- align="center" bgcolor="#ffbbb"
| April 11 || Portland* || – || Larry H. Miller Field || 4–8 || Billy Sahlinger (2–2) || Adam Miller (2–6) || None || 744 || 17–15 || 5–5
|- bgcolor="#ccffcc"
| April 12 || at Portland* || – || Larry H. Miller Field || 11–7 || Desmond Poulson (5–0) || Kurt Yinger (2–3) || None || 994 || 18–15 || 6–5
|- bgcolor="#ccffcc"
| April 13 || at Portland* || – || Larry H. Miller Field || 7–6 || Matt Milke (2–1) || J. R. Bunda (0–2) || None || 1,058 || 19–15 || 7–5
|- bgcolor="#ccffcc"
| April 23 || Utah || – || Larry H. Miller Field || 9–3 || Keaton Cenatiempo (2–2) || Chase Rezac (0–3) || None || 1,432 || 20–15 || 7–5
|- align="center" bgcolor="#ffbbb"
| April 25 || at #22 Gonzaga* || – || Washington Trust Field and Patterson Baseball Complex || 4–6 || Marco Gonzales (6–2) || Desmond Poulson (5–1) || Arturo Reyes (3) || 715 || 20–16 || 7–6
|- align="center" bgcolor="#ffbbb"
| April 26 || at #22 Gonzaga* || – || Washington Trust Field and Patterson Baseball Complex || 1–5 || Tyler Olson (8–2) || Jeff Barker (3–3) || None || 1,539 || 20–17 || 7–7
|- bgcolor="#ccffcc"
| April 27 || at #22 Gonzaga* || – || Washington Trust Field and Patterson Baseball Complex || 9–6 || Adam Miller (3–6) || Arturo Reyes (5–2) || Matt Milke (3) || 705 || 21–17 || 8–7
|- bgcolor="#ccffcc"
| April 30 || at Utah Valley|| – || Brent Brown Ballpark || 15–7 || Mark Anderson (4–1) || Ryan Evans (2–1) || None || 5,133 || 22–17 || 8–7
|-

|- bgcolor="#ccffcc"
| May 2 || at Loyola Marymount*  || – || George C. Page Stadium || 8–3 || Desmond Poulson (6–1) || Colin Welmon (5–4) || None || 126 || 23–17 || 9–7
|- bgcolor="#ccffcc"
| May 3 || at Loyola Marymount* || – || George C. Page Stadium || 3–2 || Jeff Barker (4–3) || Aaron Griffin (3–5) || None || 204 || 24–17 || 10–7
|- align="center" bgcolor="#ffbbb"
| May 4 || at Loyola Marymount* || – || George C. Page Stadium || 1–2 || Patrick Mcgrath (4–2) || Adam Miller (3–7) || Bret Dhalson (7) || 485 || 24–18 || 10–8
|- bgcolor="#CCCCCC"
| May 7 || at Utah || – || Spring Mobile Ballpark ||colspan=7|  Cancelled due to weather
|- align="center" bgcolor="#ffbbb"
| May 9 ||San Francisco* || – || Larry H. Miller Field || 1–10 || Abe Bobb (5–5) || Desmond Poulson (6–2) || None || 786 || 24–19 || 10–9
|- bgcolor="#ccffcc"
| May 10 || San Francisco* || – || Larry H. Miller Field || 10–9 || Derek Speigner (4–0) || Logan West (0–1) || None || 955 || 25–19 || 11–9
|- bgcolor="#ccffcc"
| May 11 || San Francisco* || – || Larry H. Miller Field || 6–4 || James Lengal (1–3) || Adam Cimber (5–3) || None || 1,568 || 26–19 || 12–9
|- bgcolor="#ccffcc"
| May 14 || Utah || – || Larry H. Miller Field || 5–4 || Matt Milke (3–1) || Nick Green (0–2) || None || 1,327 || 27–19 || 12–9
|- bgcolor="#ccffcc"
| May 16 || Saint Mary's* || – || Larry H. Miller Field || 11–1 || Desmond Poulson (7–2) ||  Ben Griset (4–4) || None || 1,133 || 28–19 || 13–9
|- bgcolor="#ccffcc"
| May 17 || Saint Mary's* || – || Larry H. Miller Field || 6–3 || Jeff Baker (5–3) || Jordan Mills (4–4) || Matt Milke (4) || 1,131 || 29–19 || 14–9
|- bgcolor="#ccffcc"
| May 18 || Saint Mary's* || – || Larry H. Miller Field || 14–3 || Adam Miller (4–7) || Gary Cornish (2–6) || None || 1,032 || 30–19 || 15–9
|- bgcolor="#ccffcc"
| May 21 || at #18 Arizona State || – || Packard Stadium || 8–3 || Mark Anderson (5–1) || Billy Young (0–2) || None || 2,957 || 31–19 || 15–9
|-

|-
! style="background:#FFFFFF;color:#002654;"| WCC Tournament
|- 

|- align="center" bgcolor="#ffbbb"
| May 23 || (2) San Diego* || – || Banner Island Ballpark || 8–9 (10) || Max Homick (5–1) || Matt Milke (3–2) || None || 838 || 31–20 || 0–1
|- bgcolor="#ccffcc"
|May 24 || (1) Gonzaga* || – || Banner Island Ballpark || 8–1 || Jeff Barker (6–3) || Tyler Olson (9–4) || None || 707 || 32–20 || 1–1
|- align="center" bgcolor="#ffbbb"
|May 24 || (2) San Diego* || – || Banner Island Ballpark || 4–7 || Louie Lechich (3–3) || Adam Miller (4–8) || Max Homick (5) || 904 || 32–21 || 1–2
|-

|-
| style="font-size:88%" | Rankings from USA TODAY/ESPN Top 25 coaches' baseball poll. Parenthesis indicate tournament seedings.
|-
| style="font-size:88%" | *West Coast Conference games

TV & Radio Information
All conference games, most home games, and select road games (at Utah, UNLV, and Utah Valley) were broadcast on KOVO with Brent Norton (play-by-play) calling the games for his 24th consecutive season. A rotating selection of analysts was used. Jeff Bills acted as analyst for games in California, Nevada, & Utah while Gary Pullins called the games in Oregon & Washington. Pullins was used as the sole analyst for the WCC Tournament. Many of these broadcasts were also broadcast on BYU Radio. 

BYUtv broadcast 9 home games (Mar. 21 vs. Kansas, Mar. 29 vs. Pepperdine, Apr. 2 vs. Utah Valley, Apr. 12 vs. Portland, May 10–11 vs. San Francisco, and May 16–18 vs. Saint Mary's). BYUtv used a broadcast team of Robbie Bullough as play-by-play man on weekday games, Dave McCann as play-by-play man on Saturday's, and Gary Sheide as the analyst. The WCC Tournament games were broadcast on WCC Network with a team of Andy Masur (play-by-play), Keith Ramsey (analyst), and Amanda Blackwell (reporter).

Post-season awards
4 BYU Cougars- Jaycob Brugman, Jacob Hanneman, Adam Law, and Brock Whitney were selected to the 2013 All-Conference Baseball Team.

4 members of the 2013 BYU Cougars baseball team, and 1 incoming Junior College Player, were drafted in the 2013 Major League Baseball draft. NCAA Rules allow players drafted to return as long as they don't sign a contract with the team that has drafted them. Should they do so, they will be eligible to be drafted again next season as rights last only for 1 year for members who don't sign a contract with the team who drafts them. All the drafted Cougar players would sign the contracts and go professional instead of returning.

References 

BYU
BYU Cougars baseball seasons
BYU Cougars baseball